The following list comprises the various antagonistic factions that appear in the manga Saint Seiya and the sequel Saint Seiya: Next Dimension, written and illustrated by Masami Kurumada.

The antagonistic characters appear as various deities from Greek mythology, who rule over the realms that form Earth, and their servants who form part of their armies created to wage war against Athena, the protector of the Earth realm. In addition, several factions aren't presented as soldiers of these armies, but as organizations who pursue their own ends.

Black Saints

The Black Saints are former Saints who were stripped from their title and Cloth for using their strength for personal gain, turning to a life of crime and violence. All of them trained in Death Queen Island along with several sons from Mitsumasa Kido, but most of them died. Although there is a Black Saint counterpart for each one of the 88 constellations, Kurumada featured prominently only four in his manga, the dark equivalents of the protagonists:  voiced by Shigeru Nakahara,  voiced by Kaneto Shiozawa,  voiced by Ken Yamaguchi and  voiced by Kazumi Tanaka.

They were regarded as the most powerful among the Black Saints and were collectively known as The . Their Cloths and techniques are counterparts to the ones from Pegasus Seiya, Dragon Shiryū, Andromeda Shun, and Cygnus Hyōga. Although, there is only one counterpart of each Cloth, in the manga the Black Dragon Saint has a blind brother that helps him to fight. Additionally, there are also several Black Phoenix Saints, who refer to themselves as Ikki's shadows, although in the anime one of them appears as the strongest one. The four Black Saints are defeated by their equivalents, and in the manga, they are later killed by the Silver Saints, who were meant to kill the Bronze Saints, but mistook them due to an illusion created by Aries Mu.

, leaving Black Andromeda unnamed.

 
Before Ikki, the leader of the Black Saints, who stole the Phoenix Cloth and kept it until it was retrieved by Ikki, who afterward killed him.

Blue Warriors

The  are an order of powerful warriors from the ice lands of Bluegrad (known as Sinigrad in English publication), who also draw their strength from their Cosmo. Their order was formed centuries ago by mighty warriors who, in the same way as Athena's Saints, were capable of rending the skies with their fists and splitting the earth with their kicks. They were presented by Kurumada in vol.13 of his manga, in the short story arc, he dedicated to Hyōga, "Kōri no Kuni no Natassia Hen" (The Chapter of Natassia, from the Lands of Ice). Their only known technique is "Blue Impulse".

The Marine Realm

These Generals don armors called , which are said to be as resilient as the Gold Cloths and are modeled after marine creatures of legend.

As in Greek mythology, the Greek god Poseidon is the ruler of the seas, brother of Hades and Zeus. In Kurumada's story, he reincarnates on Earth by taking the body of a chosen member of the Solo family as a vessel for his soul. This Greek family is one of the wealthiest in the world and, enjoying Poseidon's blessing, has held hegemony over the seas for millennia. In the 20th century, the god takes the body of the family's young heir, a teenager named , and strikes the Earth with incessant rains to cleanse it of humans, whom he considers evil and unworthy of the blessings of the gods. He wishes to build a utopian society on top of the ruins once all humans are eradicated and to exact revenge on Athena for having sealed his soul after their last battle, two thousand years before. To this end, he holds Athena hostage in his Undersea Temple with the help of his army. He is ultimately sealed by Athena in her amphora, but later proves that he is not an evil deity, as he awakens briefly to help the Bronze Saints fight Hypnos and Thanatos in the Hades arc by sending them the Gold Cloths.

A loyal servant of Poseidon, bound to him by a debt of life. Thetis was saved by Julian Solo when he was a little boy. She was then a beautiful fish, stranded on a beach, and Julian tossed her back into the sea. During Poseidon's kidnapping of Athena, she served as a mediator between the factions of Poseidon and Athena. Thetis is not one of the Mariner Generals, but a middle-ranking soldier, as she is superior to the Mariner rankless soldiers but subordinate to the Mariner Generals. She was unable to assist the Mariner Generals due to her defeat by Ophiuchus Shaina. The Saint spared her life and Thetis ended rescuing Julian Solo from the collapse of the Underwater Sanctuary after Athena removed Poseidon's soul from him. Thetis turned back into a fish as she died and Julian, upon finding it, let it back into the ocean, finally laying her to rest.

The vast majority of Poseidon's army, counted by the thousands. Unlike Athena's and Hades' rankless soldiers, the Rankless Mariners possess mastery over Cosmo to some degree, as they wield low-level superhuman strength and also wear weaker versions of the Scale armors worn by their superiors, the Mariner Generals.

Poseidon's Mariners
The seven most powerful warriors of Poseidon and commander  of his army. Endowed with might that equals or surpasses that of a Gold Saint, the Mariner Generals wear the Scale armors, said to be as resilient as the Gold Cloths.

Baian was the protector of the North Pacific Ocean's Mammoth Pillar, one of the eight that kept the water above from drowning the Underwater Sanctuary. He had sworn to protect the pillar at all costs. Pegasus Seiya was the first to reach him and initially struggled with the Mariner. Months before, Seiya had defeated the Silver Saint Lizard Misty, a man that, like Baian, used air currents to render himself invulnerable. With the experience reaped from that battle and his reinforced Cloth, the Saint soundly defeated Baian.

The devoted guardian of the South Pacific Ocean Pillar. Upon Andromeda Shun's arrival, Io tried to deceive the Saint with an illusion of a maiden. This did not work in the end and so they faced each other in battle. Io used attacks that matched the six creatures that made up the Scylla beast from Greek myth, but, after withstanding Scylla's attacks, Shun was able to successfully counterattack each of them. Shun spared Io, but as he prepared to destroy the Pillar with the weapons of the Libra Cloth, Io, compelled by his adamant devotion to Poseidon, jumped in front of the attack to stop it. Io's attempt failed and he was thus killed.

Krishna was the guardian of the Indian Ocean Mammoth Pillar. He employed a golden lance and spiritual power derived from the Kundalini transcendental forces. Dragon Shiryū challenged the Chrysaor Mariner. The lance proved to be too much for the Dragon Saint until he remembered that the spirit of Excalibur laid in his right arm, handed down to him by Shura. Thus he was able to break the lance in half. Krishna was not fazed and meditated to flare his Cosmo to the maximum, unleashing a final attack on Shiryū. The combat ended with Dragon Saint hitting Krishna's Chakra points while losing his sight from Krishna's attack. Krishna was defeated and Shiryū destroyed the Pillar with the help of Kiki.

Known as the "hunter of hearts" and regarded as the most fearsome Mariner, Caça was responsible for the Antarctic Ocean Mammoth Pillar. He protected it by means of treachery and deception, as he was able to draw from a person's most cherished feelings and turn them against them by masquerading as someone they held dear. He took out Pegasus Seiya, Cygnus Hyōga and Andromeda Shun with his illusions. However, when Phoenix Ikki first arrived, Caça was unable to sense any treasured feelings. He only found one enclosed deep in the Saint's heart. This, however, angered the Phoenix Saint, leading to the Limnades Mariner's death.

Isaac was once a righteous Saint apprentice along with Cygnus Hyōga in Siberia, until suffering an accident while he saved Hyōga from drowning. Isaac lost one of his eyes and was falling to the bottom of the ocean unconscious when the Kraken rescued him and took him to Poseidon's Underwater Sanctuary in the Mediterranean. There he became a Mariner and guardian of the Mammoth Pillar of the Arctic Ocean. Upon the Saints' attack on the Underwater Sanctuary, he came face to face with Hyōga and blamed him for everything that had gone wrong years ago. Cygnus Hyōga eventually overpowered him after unsuccessfully trying to repent to his old friend. As he died in Hyōga's arms, Isaac congratulated his friend for becoming so powerful.

The guardian of the South Atlantic Ocean Pillar and a virtuoso of battle music. During Poseidon's cleansing of the world, the Siren Mariner was ordered to kill the four Bronze Saints, Seiya, Hyōga, Shun and Shiryū, who were comatose in a hospital. He met with Taurus Aldebaran's resistance, but Athena interrupted the battle, ordering Sorrento to take her to Poseidon. He obliged and returned to the Underwater Sanctuary. Later, when the Saints invaded, he faced Andromeda Shun, who after a fierce fight managed to defeat Sorrento and destroy his pillar. During the events, Sorrento became suspicious of the Sea Dragon Mariner, concluding that Poseidon's resurrection and the ensuing war were the results of Sea Dragon's ambition and not Poseidon's. These suspicions were confirmed during Phoenix Ikki's battle against Sea Dragon Kanon. After Athena sealed Poseidon's soul and returned to the surface, Sorrento did the same and sought out Julian Solo, the former host of Poseidon's soul. Together they decided to travel the world and help the people that suffered in the catastrophe caused by Poseidon. Sorrento was still with Julian when Poseidon reawakened and sent help to the Bronze Saints in the battle in Elysion.

See Gold Saint Gemini Kanon.

The Underworld Realm

Voice Actor: Yūta Kasuya (in Shun's body), Akio Ōtsuka (In spirit form and in his true body)
Aided by the fearsome Hypnos and Thanatos, his closest subordinates. Both Hades and Athena have engaged each other in a long-standing conflict for domination of Earth, that spans across millennia, sparking bloody Holy Wars in the ages of myth, the 15th, 18th and 20th centuries. Hades, whose beautiful body is the spawn of the union between Cronus and Rhea, was subjected to a traumatic experience in the ages of myth, when he was gravely wounded by Pegasus Seiya's incarnation in that era. Thus, Hades decided to put his true body to rest in the unreachable Elysion, until his dominion over Earth is secured. To be able to incarnate, Hades then chose the body of the purest human in the era of his return, as a host for his divine soul, being Alone his chosen vessel during his incarnation in 1747, and Andromeda Shun in 1990. The god of the Underworld was defeated by Athena and her Saints in each of his incarnations, at the high cost of the Saints' lives and havoc over the land. Particularly bloody have been the encounters between the deities in the 18th and 20th century. During the latter, Hades retreats to shelter himself in the Underworld, believing himself safe from Athena and her Saints, who devise a way to invade Underworld. Determined to achieve domination of Earth whatever the cost, Hades unleashes the Greatest Eclipse phenomenon on Earth, which would conceal the sun, turning the planet in a gelid graveyard and exterminating all life. Against all odds, Hades is later rejected by his chosen vessel Shun, and retreats to the Elysion and captures Athena and places her in the lethal Great Amphora, assuming the Saints would never be able to trespass the Wailing Wall in time to save their goddess' life. He is proven wrong by the Saints' tenacity, and the ruler of the Underworld is forced to revive his true body, dormant for millennia since the ages of myth, and engage the Saints in a final duel to the death, during which Hades is shocked to encounter his feared enemy from the ages of myth reincarnated in Pegasus Seiya. Athena, freed from the Amphora joins her Saints in the battle, and after a brief but costly battle, against all odds, Hades is finally defeated. The mortal world is saved from the Greatest Eclipse and the Elysium collapses, but Seiya was also defeated in the battle, being pierced in the heart by Hades' sword and put into a curse which kept him in a catatonic state. In the manga sequel Next Dimension, Hades is incarnated in Alone's body, a boy that as Shun, has the purest body of the Earth.

Voice Actor: Maaya Sakamoto
The woman forever destined to unleash evil on Earth. Pandora is the guardian of Hades' soul and his flesh sister in the 20th century. At a young age, she opened the forbidden box that was sealed by Athena and released Hypnos and Thanatos. She was told that Hades would become her brother and she must protect him until the advent of the final battle. In exchange, they would grant her eternal life. She commands the first wave of Specters to attack the Sanctuary in the name of Hades in the final arc of the manga. She was given a necklace that allows her to travel through different realms, and she has a complex relationship with Ikki due to their past regarding Shun. As Hades's sister, she was his slave and was unable to see fully in color but, after seeing Ikki's iron will, she regained her sense of color and her lost memories. Because she gave Ikki the necklace, she was deemed a traitor and killed by Thanatos.
Pandora also appears during her 18th-century incarnation fulfilling the role given to her as destiny.
Ability: Teleportation, Telepathy, Spear, Ability to summon lightning.

Voice Actor: Toshio Furukawa
The god of death and a close servant of Hades, who has fought against Athena's Saints since the ages of myth. He along with his twin brother Hypnos reside in Elysion and see to their god's ambitions. Thanatos, is the more impulsive of the brothers, was quick to attack Athena's Bronze Saints when they arrived in Elysion, deeming their trespass blasphemy. When Thanatos was bruised by Pegasus Seiya, he was personally offended and even went to the lengths of trying to kill the Saint's sister. This did however backfire as Seiya rose to a new level of power, resurrecting his God Cloth and soon defeated the god.

Voice Actor: Issei Futamata
The god of sleep, also a close servant of Hades and the twin brother of Thanatos, who has fought against Athena's Saints since the ages of myth. Hypnos was more cautious than his brother and stayed out of the way from Athena's Bronze Saints. He did, however, act when the Saints gained a higher form of power as he thought them to be dangerous to the gods themselves, as he was a witness of the power of the God Cloths in the ages of myth. In his effort to stop Pegasus Seiya he was however halted by the other Bronze Saints as they each successfully resurrected their God Cloths and severely wounded the god. Hypnos lived long enough to sense the moment when Hades true body was awakened, but succumbed to his injuries soon after.

She is directly responsible for Gemini Saga's perversion, as she used her feared bad omen star on him, causing him to be possessed by an evil spirit, the origin of his rebellion against Athena.

The Specters

The  are the equivalents of Athena's Saints in Hades' Army. The 108 Specters, 36 ranked as Heavenly Stars with the remaining 72 being Earthly Stars, as well as their respective epithets, are based on the 108 Stars of Destiny from the classic Chinese novel Water Margin. The proof of their status is found in the armors they wear, called , said to shine as a dark diamond.  The leadership of Hades' army is formed by the collective known as the three Magnates of Underworld whose might surpasses those of the Gold Saints.

Voice Actor: Takehito Koyasu
The first of the 3 Specter magnates to be introduced by Kurumada. Against Pandora's orders, he sends a task force of Specters to Athena's Sanctuary to keep tabs on the revived Gold Saints' mission. When the task force fails, he is punished by Pandora but remains on earth in Hades' castle. When the Bronze Saints arrive his subordinates take care of them, leaving Rhadamanthys free to descend to the underworld, where he eventually faces off against Gemini Kanon, but their fight is interrupted. He later kills Lyra Orphée when the latter tries to assassinate Hades. He later meets Kanon again and after a long battle, the Saint relinquishes his Cloth and performs a suicide attack on Rhadamanthys ending their lives.

Voice Actor:Kouichi Toochika
Minos is officially the judge of the souls of the dead that come to the Underworld. He appeared during Orphée's assassination attempt on Hades, which he slept through by the Saint's power. He later came to face against Gemini Kanon but was told to leave by Wyvern Rhadamanthys. He was injured when he stumbled upon the Wailing Wall just as the Gold Saints pierced it with a burst of sunlight. He then chased the remaining Bronze Saints to the other dimension lying past the wall, where he was ultimately pulverized by the pressure of that dimension, that only divine blood could repel.

Vermeer, the Heavenly Noble Star, is the Griffon Specter of the Holy War of the 18th century. After Pandora and Hades have made their way to the castle, he sets out to finish Aries Shion, Libra Dohko and Pegasus Tenma. With little effort, he overpowers Tenma and thus starts fighting the two Gold Saints. His first move is throwing them high up in the air to demonstrate his power, seeing as they are inside Hades barrier which weakens the Saints power tenfold. He then proceeds by using his Cosmic Marionettion technique and traps the Saints, whom he tortures by breaking Dohko's hand. But as he is about to break Shion's neck, Garuda Suikyō appears. He tells him that Pandora is looking for him and that he doesn't need to exterminate the Saints.

Voice Actor: Shinichiro Miki
One of the 3 Specter Magnates, being fierce and proud. He also attends Orphée's performance which he sleeps through due to the Saint's power. He later faces of against Phoenix Ikki whom he gravely underestimates, eventually leading to his demise.

Voice actor: Shirō Saitō
Just as in the myths, Charon was responsible for ferrying the dead over the river Acheron in hell. He had a knack for singing during the trip which he charged a silver coin for. One day the warriors of Athena arrived, the Saints Pegasus Seiya and Andromeda Shun. The Specter bickered and fought with the saints, but would ferry them across if they could pay him. Shun offered his pendant, but the Specter gave it back when he thought the Andromeda Saint actually had a chance to enter Elysion. With Pegasus Seiya, he was however not pleased with and after reaching the other shore, they made a standoff where Seiya was the victor.

A young female Specter, Acheron Nyan is the incarnation of the Acheron Specter in the 18th century. As a ferrywoman, Nyan guards the shores of the Acheron river in the underworld, taking the dead to the other side upon receiving her payment. She meets Taurus Ox and is shocked to realize he is seemingly alive until Ophiuchus Odysseus suddenly arrives. Nyan is the first female Specter created by Kurumada and presented in his work.

Voice actor: Susumu Chiba
When Griffon Minos was unavailable to perform his duty as the Judge of departed souls, his subordinate Balron René stepped in to wield his whip. At one of these moments, René encountered the Saints of Athena who were invading the underworld. It was first the Pegasus and Andromeda saints who he performed a judgment on, but he had already been put under an illusion by Gemini Kanon. As such nothing he did took place, even cutting Shun, the soon to be Hades' body to pieces. Terrified for his blasphemy he ran outside to search for the body which had mysteriously disappeared, along the way he encountered Wyvern Rhdamanthys who exposed the Gemini Saint's bluff. René caught Kanon with his whip but the Saint sent a Cosmo spark through the whip which destroyed him.

Voice actor: Jun'ichi Suwabe
Pharaoh was once one of Hades' most favored Specters due to his musical talents on his Demon Harp and the guardian of the second prison in hell. However, when one of Athena's warriors, the Saint called Lyra Orpheé arrived in hell to free his love, Pharaoh was ordered by Pandora to trick the Saint so that he would remain in the underworld forever and be a part of Hades' army. This led much to Pharaoh's chagrin when Orphee became the new favorite musician of Hades. The Sphinx Specter came to resent the Saint since then and would do anything to reclaim his favored position. When the Bronze Saints of Pegasus and Andromeda arrived at his prison, he sent his beloved pet Cerberus on them but with little effect. The Lyra Saint suddenly interfered and made the Bronze Saints unconscious while saying to the Specter that he was going to dispose of them. Pharaoh didn't believe him completely and followed him, and just as he expected the Saint had tricked him and let the Saints live. In his joy to finally be able to dispose of the Lyra Saint, Pharaoh revealed that he was the one that had tricked Orphee. This did however backfire as it made Orphee very angry, and in a fierce battle of lethal music, Sphinx Pharaoh met his end.

Voice actor: Yūsei Oda
Queen was more cheerful than his two companions, Gordon and Sylphid who all served under Wyvern Rhadamanthys. Queen first appeared in Hades' castle on earth where he pummeled the Bronze Saints a little. He then retreated to the underworld where he wouldn't appear until Athena's Saints had broken through the Wailing Wall to Elysion. Dragon Shiryū valiantly stood to protect his fellow Saints and in the ensuing battle Queen underestimated him and was soon killed.

Voice actor: Hiro
Gordon was the more aggressive than his two companions, Queen, and Sylphid who all part of Wyvern Rhadamanthys troops of the 108 Specters. Gordon first appeared in Hades' castle on earth where he pummeled the four Bronze Saints. He then retreated to the underworld where he wouldn't appear until Athena's Saints had broken through the Wailing Wall to Elysion. Dragon Shiryū valiantly stood to protect his fellow Saints and in the ensuing battle Gordon underestimated him and was soon killed by an outburst of the Saint's Cosmo.

Voice actor: Tetsu Inada
The Basilisk Specter acted like the leader of his two companions, Gordon, and Queen who served under Rhadamanthys. They all appeared in Hades' castle on earth where they pummeled the Bronze Saints a little. They then retreated to the underworld where the three Specters wouldn't appear until Athena's Saints had broken through the Wailing Wall to Elysion. Dragon Shiryū valiantly stood to protect his fellow Saints and in the ensuing battle Sylphid underestimated him and his comrades were killed. Despite warnings, he followed them through the Wailing Wall, and without divine blood, his Surplice armor couldn't withstand the pressure and was vaporized along with him.

Voice actor: Eiji Takemoto
Valentine is one of Wyvern Rhadamanthys loyal followers and protects him from something he regards as insignificant like a Bronze Saint of Athena. He first appeared in Hades' castle on earth where he fought with Pegasus Seiya but said he would fight him again eventually. When the Bronze Saints had reached Hades' palace in the underworld called Giudecca, Valentine was ordered to dispose of the Phoenix and Pegasus Saint's bodies in the icy plains of Cocyutus. Though when Pegasus awoke the Saint said he had Athena's Cloth with him, and as such Valentine took him out of the ice. The Saint persisted to hold on to the Cloth and eventually retaliated against the Harpy Specter, who was defeated in an instant by hundreds of kicks.

Voice actor: Kiyoyuki Yanada
Phlegyas served as the warden of the dark lake of the fourth prison in Hell. When the Saints of Athena had infiltrated the underworld the Specters were on high alert. Cygnus Hyōga, Dragon Shiryū, and Gemini Kanon reached the dark lake together, but the only way to get across was by Phlegyas' raft. He immediately attacked them, knocking the Bronze Saints unconscious with ease. Both landed on the raft which Kanon pushed out into the lake and stood ready to fight the Specter. But the Gemini Gold Saint was far more powerful. Phlegyas was killed by a single attack from Kanon, leaving him free to jump on the raft.

Voice actor: Yasuhiko Kawazu
The Guardian Specter of the Third Prison of Hell, Golem Rock tried to kill Gemini Kanon, Dragon Shiryū and Cygnus Hyōga, with a mudslide. Failing in the attempt, an enraged Rock tried again to kill the Saints with his signature technique, only to be killed by the overwhelming strength of Shiryū.

Voice actor: Keiji Hirai
The second guardian Specter of the Third Prison of Hell, Troll Ivan is easily killed by Cygnus Hyōga, while trying to introduce himself to the trespassing Saints.

Enormous in size, the bulkiest Specter in Hades' army, he appears briefly, collapsing after being killed by Gemini Kanon.

Voice actor: Hisao Egawa
Cyclops Gigant was the leader of the Specter force sent by Wyvern Rhadamanthys to invade Athena's Sanctuary. He was sent to keep tabs on the revived Gold Saints who were supposed to kill Athena whom they had served before. The Gold Saints did, however, disappear so the Specters saw no way but to continue the mission on their own. Gigant and his companions managed to get as far as to the Virgo Temple when he suspected that there was a traitor among his men but were interrupted by the presence of Virgo Shaka. During their encounter, it was revealed that the Gold Saints had killed and disguised themselves as some of the Specters. The Gold Saints was however allowed to pass through the Temple and so, the Specter thought they were also allowed. But Shaka immediately attacked and killed all six remaining Specters. Gigant squirmed with his last breath that those who served Hades would be rewarded with eternal life. Shaka replied that he, who had conversed with gods in the past, had never been told a human had been given eternal life. Gigant gasped in horror as he realized that Hades had tricked them before he died.

Voice actor: Ryotarō Okiayu
Sent among the 17 Specters infiltrating Athena's Sanctuary, to keep tabs on the revived Gold Saints. During the invasion, the revived Gold Saints feigned their defeat in an attack from Virgo Shaka. In the confusion. Saga killed Cube and took his Surplice as a disguise. The Dullahan Surplice covered most of the body so it was a very suitable disguise.

Voice actor: Nobutoshi Kanna
Sent among the 17 Specters infiltrating Athena's Sanctuary to keep tabs on the revived Gold Saints. During the invasion, the revived Gold Saints feigned their defeat in an attack from Virgo Shaka. In the confusion, Aquarius Camus killed Mills and took his Surplice as a disguise. The Elf Surplice covered most of the body so it was a very suitable disguise.

Voice actor: Takeshi Kusao
Sent among the 17 Specters infiltrating Athena's Sanctuary to keep tabs on the revived Gold Saints. During the invasion, the revived Gold Saints feigned their defeat in an attack from Virgo Shaka. In the confusion, Capricorn Shura killed Ochs and took his Surplice as a disguise. The Gorgon Surplice covered most of the body so it was a very suitable disguise.

Voice actor: Atsushi Kisaichi
The Papillon Specter is one of the few that were physically completely changed when he awakened as a Specter. He reverted to a living form of a gel-like substance. During the invasion of Athena's Sanctuary, the Specters apprehended Aries Mu to interrogate him about the whereabouts of their guides, the revived Gold Saints. Mew interfered and told them to back off because he wanted to fight against the strongest psychic in the Sanctuary, which he was also claimed to be in Hades' army. During the fight, he went through two stages of Evolution, from the gel substance to a monstrous caterpillar, to a Chrysalis in which he underwent his final transformation into an entomomorphic human. Their fight was a display of psychic strength which in the end was won by Aries Mu. Mew had the ability to spawn small butterflies called "Hell butterflies" which he used to track his opponent with. One of these survived and came to survey the rest of the invasion and they also appears in the 18th-century holy war in Next Dimension. Finally, the Papillon Specter appears during its reincarnation in the 18th century,  appears in Next Dimension, as one of Pandora's assassins sent to murder Sasha Athena.

Voice actor: Shingo Horii
Niobe was the first Specter to announce himself during the invasion of Athena's Sanctuary. As the Specters reached the Taurus Temple he stepped forward and defeated Taurus Aldebaran with a deadly pheromone. He chooses to stay behind momentarily as his comrades continued ahead. When Aries Mu arrived at the temple he revealed himself by splitting the remaining figure of Aldebaran. The Gold Saint had however left a hint about Niobe's deadly pheromone in his Cosmo to Mu. Trying to engage Mu in combat, he was ignored by the latter, who considered Niobe already dead. Niobe was then completely torn apart by the delayed effect of Aldebaran's Great Horn.

Voice Actor: Kazuya Nakai
Raimi was one of the 17 Specters sent in secret by Wyvern Rhadamanthys to attack Athena's stronghold, Sanctuary. When the group reached the Temple of Leo, five of them were immediately killed by its guardian, Leo Aiolia. As the other Specters continued their attack, Raimi saw this as an opening and entangled the Gold Saint, claiming him to be his victim. However, the Specter underestimated Aiolia and after sending the other Specters to the next temple, Raimi was soon killed by the Leo Gold Saint
The Worm Specter in the 18th century also appears briefly in Next Dimension, battling against Leo Kaiser, whom he is unable to defeat, and the Specter is ultimately defeated by Cancer Deathtoll with a humiliating attack. The name of the Worm Specter in that era was not revealed by Kurumada, although he wears the same Surplice and his appearance is identical to Raimi's.

Voice Actor: Bin Shimada
Zelos was the one who sent the 17 Specters to Athena's Sanctuary by the order of Wyvern Rhadamanthys. He acted as the messenger of the events in the Sanctuary to Rhadamanthys, even though he questioned Wyvern's decision due to Pandora's wrath. As the revived Gold Saints came to Hades castle with Athena's body, Zelos was there to greet them. The Gold Saints disregarded him and Aquarius Camus pushed him aside with his cold winds. Thus, when the revived Saints lay dying on the floor due to their time limit, the Specter took out his frustration on Camus. This would prove not in his favor as Cygnus Hyōga and the other Bronze Saints burst through the ceiling. With his own cold blast, the Cygnus Saint hastily killed the Frog Specter.

The Frog Specter in the 18th century.

An unidentified character who briefly appears before Crateris Suikyō, conveying Hades' offer to become one of the three magnates of the Underworld and save his younger brother Suishō's life, in exchange of loyalty to him. Kurumada has yet to reveal his name and star, as the only confirmed fact is the mythical being represented by his Surplice.

Unnamed Specters
Kurumada also presented some Specters that were killed promptly and thus were not identified, except for their destiny stars:
Appearing during the Specter's assault in Sanctuary:

At the Black Valley, who tried to kill Gemini Kanon:

Guarding the Cocytus prison in hell: (voiced by Dai, Masaru Suzuki)

And the final Specters killed by Phoenix Ikki at the Wailing Wall:

23 new Specters were added to the Saint Seiya universe by Kurumada in Next Dimension, although they were not named and their destiny stars remain to be revealed: 9 of them were part of Garuda Suikyō's cadre invading Sanctuary, and other 7 appear freeing Cancer Deathtoll in the Hill to the Land of Spirits. One new Specter appears among the cadre killed by Phoenix Ikki and Deathtoll, the rest are Specters from Kurumada's original manga appearing in their 18th-century incarnation, and a few Skeleton soldiers. 6 new Specters appear in Griffon Vermeer's cadre invading Sanctuary.

The rankless soldiers from Hades' army, wearing weaker versions of the Specter Surplices, and armed often with sickles, as they have no mastery over Cosmo. His voice was provided by Naoki Tatsuta.

The Heavenly Realm

Angels

To date, Kurumada has shown them as loyal to the moon goddess Artemis.

Voice Actor: Hikaru Midorikawa
Eagle Marin's long lost brother. Mentioned by Ophiuchus Shaina in the final volume of Masami Kurumada's manga. His background was further revealed in the Tenkai-Hen Josō ~Overture~ theatrical feature and its introductory short comic book, authored by Kurumada, in both of which he appears as an Angel. His movie incarnation now remains out of the Saint Seiya canon, as he is now being featured in the latest installments of Saint Seiya: Next Dimension, in which he also appears as an Angel, chained in the prison of the moon and is released by Callisto, with the mission to assassinate Pegasus Seiya, his reward being his freedom if he fulfills it. His Glory is specifically named . His mission comes to a halt due to the intervention of Cygnus Hyōga and Eagle Marin, whom he finds familiar. Although Kurumada has retained many of his original traits, whether he will remain the same character portrayed in the film or a completely new rendition, is yet to be revealed.

The Lunar Realm
The  is ruled by the beautiful goddess Artemis, older sister to Athena and younger sister of Apollon. Although Artemis initially shows hostility to Athena, she later offers her assistance. Despite this, Artemis' servants plot secretly to kill Athena and her Saints. Additionally, the Angels, the warriors of the Heavenly Realm, seem to have pledged allegiance to Artemis.

The beautiful goddess of the moon, and elder sister to Athena. The goddess is initially hostile to her sister due to her battles with Hades and Poseidon. Though she reveals to Athena that the only way to remove Hades' curse from Seiya's body is to travel back in time with the help of Chronos. Her base of operations is the temple of the moon, situated on the slopes of Mount Olympus. This temple is protected by numerous soldiers called "Satellites".

Servant of Artemis and high-ranking officer among the Satellites, the personal guard of Artemis. She is very caring of her goddess, and will resort to anything for her safety. Callisto initially warns the goddess Athena not to visit Artemis because she is angered by the goddess of war's past conflicts. Athena refuses, so Callisto allows her to pass. She still deems her very risky to Artemis so she later sends Lascomoune, captain of the Satellites, to kill Athena. After her failure, she resorts to sending the much more powerful warrior, Tōma the Angel, to kill Athena's Saints, releasing him from the Lunar Prison. In chapter 30 of Saint Seiya Next Dimension, during Tōma's reintroduction to the canon, Callisto replaces the shady, unidentified character that freed the Angel, in Kurumada's short introductory comic book for the now apocryphal ~Overture~ film.

The elderly witch of the moon. Kurumada based her on the mythological persona Hecate. She tricks Athena into cutting off her hair by means of an illusion of multiple pathways to the temple of the moon. She makes a brew with Athena's hair which restores her youth, becoming a young girl again. She then guides Athena to Chronos who in turn punishes her, turning her body into dust. Later, she resurfaces unharmed, as she was able to survive Chronos' assault. The young Hecate displays a childish and whimsical behavior and has exhibited the ability to transform into a crow. Sometime after Athena's departure, she assists the Saints in reaching Athena's garland, which leads them to the era of the past Holy War. Hecate is a thousand years old, and it is the keeper of the road leading to the temple of Artemis, situated on the slopes of Olympus, which begins with a very large stone column, surmounted by a crescent moon.

Satellites
The  are guardians of the moon and women/soldiers of Artemis. The Satellites are all excellent archer, their armor, recall the legend Japanese of the moon rabbits.

Captain of the Satellites. Known to never let her target escape. Lascoumoune is ordered by Callisto to kill Athena to spare grief to their goddess Artemis. Her subordinates are defeated in an instant by Andromeda Shun, but Lascoumoune takes him down with her Crimson Viper attack, only to be interrupted by the arrival of the Phoenix Saint, Ikki. She is then seriously wounded by the Saint after a brief encounter, with her own arrow. Her armor is black as it represents a viper.

Anime-only antagonists

Some antagonistic factions do not exist in Masami Kurumada's Saint Seiya manga, appearing only in the TV anime adaptation. These include the Ghost Saints, the henchmen of Pope Ares, some Silver Saints and Odin's Asgardians.

See also
List of Saint Seiya characters

References

Antagonists
Lists of villains
Anime and manga supervillains